The 5th TVyNovelas Awards, is an Academy of special awards to the best of soap operas and TV shows. The awards ceremony took place on 1987 in the Centro Libanés of Mexico City, Mexico D.F. The ceremony was televised in the Mexico by Canal de las estrellas.

Raúl Velasco and Gloria Calzada hosted the show. Cuna de lobos won 9 awards, the most for the evening including Best Telenovela of the Year. Other winners El camino secreto won 2 awards and Monte calvario, Pobre juventud, and La indomable won 1 each.

Summary of awards and nominations

Winners and nominees

Teleovelas

Others

References 

TVyNovelas Awards
TVyNovelas Awards
TVyNovelas Awards
TVyNovelas Awards ceremonies